John Cameron Dryden (February 3, 1893 near Ste. Agathe, Manitoba – October 15, 1951) was a politician in Manitoba, Canada.  He served in the Legislative Assembly of Manitoba from 1941 to 1949, and was a cabinet minister in the governments of Stuart Garson and Douglas Campbell.

Dryden was educated at the Manitoba Agricultural College, and worked as a farmer.  He served for ten years on the municipal council of Ste. Agathe, and served overseas in World War I from 1915 to 1918 as a member of the Royal Canadian Engineers.  Dryden received a military medal in 1917. In 1919, he married Luella Mary Kemp.

He was first elected to the Manitoba legislature in the 1941 provincial election, defeating Liberal-Progressive candidate L.A. Slater in the rural constituency of Morris.  Although elected as an independent, Dryden was a supporter of the coalition government led by Liberal-Progressive Premier John Bracken.  He joined the Liberal-Progressive Party himself during the parliament which followed.

Dryden was appointed to Stuart Garson's cabinet on February 4, 1944, as Minister of Education.  Returned without difficulty in the 1945 election, he held this position until December 14, 1948, while he was promoted to Provincial Treasurer by Garson's replacement, Douglas Campbell.

Dryden was defeated in the 1949 provincial election by Harry Shewman, an independent candidate.  He remained as a caretaker Provincial Treasurer until February 16, 1950, when he resigned his office.  He did not seek a return to the legislature, and died in Winnipeg at the age of 58.

References 

1893 births
1951 deaths
Manitoba Liberal Party MLAs
Members of the Executive Council of Manitoba
People from Eastman Region, Manitoba
Finance ministers of Manitoba